Animal welfare and rights in Russia is about the treatment of and laws concerning non-human animals in Russia.  Russia has highly limited animal welfare protections by international standards.

Legislation 
Russia's Penal Code addresses animal cruelty under its chapter on crimes against human health and public morality.  The Code prohibits causing injury or death to an animal with malicious or mercenary motives, or with sadistic methods, or in the presence of minors.

Besides the anti-cruelty provisions of the Penal Code, there are no animal welfare laws addressing farm animals, companion animals, animals used in research, animals used for work, or animals used for recreation.

In 2014 Russia's animal protection regulations received an F out of possible grades A,B,C,D,E,F,G on World Animal Protection's Animal Protection Index. It was increased to a D grade in the 2020 Animal Protection Index.

Animals used for food 

In 2010, there were over 445 million chickens on Russian farms.  77 percent of these were on agricultural enterprises (as opposed to households and peasant farms), up from 68 percent in 2005.

A similar trend towards agricultural enterprises in pig farming was observed: from 2005 to 2010, agricultural enterprises increased pig inventories from 7 million to 11 million while rural households decreased from 6 million to 5.6 million.  Cattle inventories on both farm types declined from 2005 to 2010: on agricultural enterprises, from 11 million down to 9.3 million, and among rural households from 9.6 million to 9.2 million.

Russian chicken and pig production has increasingly moved towards an intensive farming model.  There are no regulations on animal farming other than the general anti-cruelty provision in the Penal Code.  De-beaking, de-toeing, tail-docking, tooth pulling, castration, and dehorning of livestock without anaesthetic are legal, as is confinement in gestation crates and battery cages.

In 2014, Russian fishermen caught an estimated 4.215 million metric tons of wild fish.  In 2016, annual aquaculture output was estimated at 160,000 metric tons.

Animals used for research 

Testing cosmetics on animals is legal in Russia.  In 2015, Russian parliament considered a ban on this practice, but as of June 2016 no ban has been passed.

Animals used for clothing 

As of 2013 Russia was the world's largest fur market; 80% of Russians wear fur during the winter.  It is also one of the fastest-growing markets for luxury furs.

Russia is a major producer of mink, with roughly 2.7 million pelts in 2011.  Russia also produced about 120,000 fox skins in 2011.

Fur animals are raised on fur farms, which are unregulated except for the anti-cruelty provisions in the Penal Code, as well as trapped.  The most popular form of trapping in Russia is the leg hold trap, which has been banned in 90 countries for being inhumane.

Animal activism  

VITA Animal Rights Center is a Russian animal activist organization whose activities include campaigning for better conditions for farm animals, promoting veganism, opposing fur production, pushing for the use of alternatives to animal testing, and addressing Russia's stray cat and dog program through sterilization and provision of shelter.  In 2013, VITA organized anti-fur protests spanning 46 Russian cities.  In 2014, VITA published undercover videos of circus trainers abusing circus animals by whipping, punching, kicking them and slamming their faces against the floor.

LAPA is a UK animal charity founded in 2013 to help Russian animals.  Its goals are to reduce pet overpopulation through promoting sterilization and running sterilization programs, and to reduce animal cruelty through school educational programs.

One of the unusual shelters for animals was founded in Russia by Lily Gazizullina for cows destined for slaughter. She saved 24 cows so far. Lily Gazizullina was featured in the BBC season "100 women" 2016.

See also  
 Timeline of animal welfare and rights
 Animal rights movement
 Animal consciousness
 History of vegetarianism

 Pets of Vladimir Putin

References  

Fauna of Russia
Russia
Environmental issues in Russia